Gornji Katun is a village in the municipality of Varvarin, Serbia. According to the 2002 census, the village has a population of  1468 people.

The Old Slavic Temnić inscription was found in the village.

References

Populated places in Rasina District